was born in Osaka, Japan and was a General Manager in the Nuclear Asset Management Department of the Tokyo Electric Power Co., Inc. (TEPCO), Japan. He was the plant manager during the Fukushima Daiichi nuclear disaster, where he played a critical role by disobeying corporate headquarters orders to stop using seawater to cool the reactors. According to nuclear physicist Dr. Michio Kaku, the decision to use seawater arguably prevented a much greater disaster. Without the last ditch effort to use seawater to cool the reactor, a much greater catastrophe that could have contaminated much of northern Japan may have occurred. Yoshida managed to gain the trust of Prime Minister Naoto Kan, whom he met the day after the tsunami on a plant tour. They had both attended the Tokyo Institute of Technology.

On 12 March 2011, about 28 hours after the tsunami struck, Yoshida and other TEPCO executives had ordered workers to start injecting seawater into Reactor No. 1 to keep the reactor from overheating and going into meltdown. But 21 minutes later, they ordered Yoshida to suspend the operation. Yoshida chose to ignore the order and ordered the plant workers to continue. At 20:05 JST that night, the Japanese government again ordered seawater to be injected into Unit 1.

The week of 7 June 2011, TEPCO gave Yoshida a verbal reprimand for defying the order and not reporting it earlier.

Yoshida was diagnosed with esophageal cancer, TEPCO alleges that his death unrelated to the nuclear accident, due to the rapidness of its onset.  He retired as plant manager in early December 2012.
 He  underwent an operation for the cancer and later suffered a non-fatal stroke.

Yoshida died on 9 July 2013. He was 58 and is survived by his wife, Yoko, and three sons. "If Yoshida wasn’t there, the disaster could have been much worse”, said Reiko Hachisuka,  head of a business group in Okuma town. Former Prime Minister Naoto Kan tweeted a tribute, “I bow in respect for his leadership and decision-making".

See also
 Radiation effects from Fukushima Daiichi nuclear disaster
 Lists of nuclear disasters and radioactive incidents
 Fukushima 50

References

External links
 Mainichi article
 Fukushima Nuclear Plant Manager Praised For Heroic Decisions During Meltdown Dies Of Cancer

1955 births
2013 deaths
Fukushima Daiichi nuclear disaster
Deaths from esophageal cancer
Japanese nuclear engineers
People from Osaka